Husayn ibn Ahmad is an Arabic name that may refer to:

Abd Allah al-Radi (died 881), tenth Isma'ili Imam and father of Abd Allah al-Mahdi Billah, founder of the Fatimid Caliphate
Abu Abdallah al-Shi'i (died 911), Isma'ili missionary active in Yemen and in North Africa among the Kutama Berbers
Abu Ali al-Husayn ibn Ahmad al-Madhara'i, also known as Abu Zunbur, 10th-century Abbasid official in Egypt and Syria
Abu Abdallah al-Husayn ibn Ahmad al-Mughallis, 10th-century poet and composer of riddles working at the Buyid court
Husyan ibn Ahmad, ruled over the Bedouin tribes in Syria as the  under the Ottomans in